Cumia brazieri is a species of sea snail, a marine gastropod mollusk in the family Colubrariidae, the spindle snails, the tulip snails and their allies .

Description
The shell size is up to 70 mm

Distribution
This species occurs off Queensland and New South Wales, Australia

References

External links
 

Colubrariidae
Gastropods of Australia
Gastropods described in 1869